The British Journal of Occupational Therapy is a monthly peer-reviewed medical journal covering occupational therapy. It is published by SAGE Publications on behalf of the Royal College of Occupational Therapists. The journal was established in 1938 as the journal of the Association of Occupational Therapists, obtaining its current title in 1974.

References

External links

Occupational therapy journals
SAGE Publishing academic journals
Monthly journals
English-language journals
Publications established in 1950